Synsepalum brevipes is a shrub or medium-sized to large tree in the family Sapotaceae, that is native to the African tropics and subtropics.

Range and habitat
It occurs in the African tropics and in subtropical lowlands from Angola to Zimbabwe and Mozambique. It occurs in dry evergreen forest or as a component of riparian vegetation.

Description
Damaged wood or bark exudes a milky latex, and the bark's slash mark is red. Twigs and young leaves have a downy texture. The sweet-scented flowers are produced from late summer to autumn. Edible fruit appear in late winter and contain one smooth seed.

References

External links

brevipes
Trees of Angola
Flora of Mozambique
Taxa named by John Gilbert Baker